Adam Nawałka (born 23 October 1957) is a retired Polish football player and former manager of Poland.

Player career

Club
Nawałka comes from a footballing family. His father, Adam, played for the local team Orlęta (Eaglets) Rudawa. Nawałka began his career in 1969 with Wisła Kraków. His debut in Polish top-tier league was on 21 May 1975. He played 190 matches in the highest class of Polish association football, scoring 9 goals. In 1985, he left Wisła to join the United States club, Polish-American Eagles. He played most of his career for The White Star. He started having recurrent injuries in the fall of 1978, and despite repeated surgeries, he had to retire from professional soccer in 1984. In 1985, he emigrated to the United States where he played semi-pro soccer at the Polish-American Eagles as well as performing manual labor jobs (like trimming trees around high-voltage power lines). In 1990, he returned to Poland and started selling Trabant (East German) cars with Volkswagen engines until he received his coaching qualifications in 1995.

National team
He played for the Polish national team (34 matches) and was a participant at the 1978 FIFA World Cup. At the age of 19, he played 90 minutes of every game (except 1) that the Polish team played. In the fall of 1978, Nawalka started having recurrent injuries that shortly eliminated him from the national team and shortened his playing career.

Managerial career
After receiving his coaching qualifications he coached the Polish III-rd league team Swit Krzeszowice, after which he held numerous positions at his home club of Wisla Kraków, including head of scouting and sports director, as well as being interim head coach a few times.  He went on to manage GKS Katowice and later Górnik Zabrze. He was an assistant coach of the Polish national team and the understudy to Leo Beenhakker in 2007 and 2008. On 26 October 2013, the Polish FA president Zbigniew Boniek, announced that Nawałka would replace Waldemar Fornalik as the new manager of the Polish national team. At the time of the appointment, his side Górnik Zabrze was riding the Polish League. He remained with Zabrze until 1 November, and focused on the national team after the game against Cracovia. On 11 October 2014, he recorded an upset by defeating Germany with 2–0 in their home Euro 2016 qualifier. He became the first Polish manager to successfully guided Poland into the UEFA European Championship, and also took Poland to their first Euro quarterfinals, which contributed to Poland's historic success in their football history since the fall of communist rule.

He was allowed to remain in charge of Poland during the 2018 World Cup qualifying campaign, and Poland performed extremely well, winning eight, drawing one and losing only one match, helping the Poles top the group and qualify automatically for the Russia 2018 FIFA World Cup. However, like in the 2002 and 2006 editions of the World Cup, Nawałka's Poland finished bottom of Group H losing consecutive games against Senegal and Colombia. With their exit from the tournament sealed after the opening two games, Poland rounded off the group with a 1-0 victory over Japan, thus leaving the tournament with just one win. Shortly after the tournament, Nawałka resigned from his role.

Managerial statistics

Honours

Player
Wisła Kraków
Ekstraklasa: 1977–78

Manager 

Wisła Kraków
Ekstraklasa: 2000–01
League Cup: 2000–01

References

External links

1957 births
Living people
Association football midfielders
Polish footballers
Polish expatriate footballers
Poland international footballers
Polish football managers
1978 FIFA World Cup players
Wisła Kraków players
Footballers from Kraków
Ekstraklasa players
Expatriate soccer players in the United States
Polish expatriate sportspeople in the United States
Wisła Kraków managers
Zagłębie Lubin managers
Jagiellonia Białystok managers
Sandecja Nowy Sącz managers
Górnik Zabrze managers
GKS Katowice managers
Poland national football team managers
Lech Poznań managers
UEFA Euro 2016 managers
2018 FIFA World Cup managers